Anthony John Von Fricken  (May 30, 1869 – March 22, 1947) was a pitcher in Major League Baseball who played in one game with the  Boston Beaneaters on May 9, 1890. He pitched the complete game and got the loss, while allowing 16 runs, 9 of which were earned. He struck out 2 and walked 8.

External links
Baseball Reference

Boston Beaneaters players
Major League Baseball pitchers
19th-century baseball players
1869 births
1947 deaths
Baseball players from New York (state)